The Raven is the fourth studio album by English new wave band the Stranglers, released on 15 September 1979, through record label United Artists.

Background 

The first two songs, much of the artwork (the band is shown standing on the prow of a Viking longship on the back cover) and the album title refer to Norse mythology. The album deals with a variety of issues, including Japanese ritual suicide ("Ice"), heroin use ("Don't Bring Harry"), the Iranian Revolution ("Shah Shah a Go Go") and genetic engineering ("Genetix").

"Dead Loss Angeles" features guitarist Hugh Cornwell playing bass guitar in conjunction with bassist Jean-Jacques Burnel, who wrote the song's heavy bass line. No lead or rhythm guitars feature on the track, whose lyrics were written by Cornwell about his experiences in the United States.

The Raven is the first Stranglers album not produced by Martin Rushent, instead being produced by the band with engineer Alan Winstanley.

Release 
The Raven was released on 15 September 1979. It reached No. 4 in the UK albums chart, remaining in the chart for eight weeks.

The album was originally released with a limited-edition 3D cover. Another limited edition had to be created when the band was forced to remove an image of Joh Bjelke-Petersen from the inner sleeve artwork. Bjelke-Petersen was the subject of the album's sixth track, "Nuclear Device (The Wizard of Aus)".

"Duchess" was the first and most successful single from the album, released on 10 August 1979 and reaching No. 14 on the UK Singles Chart. "Nuclear Device (The Wizard of Aus)" was the second single released; this reached No. 36 on the same chart. A four-track  EP, "Don't Bring Harry", was released in November. In addition to the title track and a live version of "In the Shadows", it also included  "Wired" (taken from Cornwell and Robert Williams' forthcoming album Nosferatu) and a live version of "Crabs" (a track from Burnel's solo album, Euroman Cometh). It reached No. 41.

Track listing 

2016 expanded vinyl edition 
Self-released by the Stranglers, The Raven received a deluxe vinyl reissue in 2016, limited to 1500 numbered copies. The original 11-track album is coupled with a bonus 9-track album, entitled Treasures Captured, which features B-sides, alternate versions and radio sessions.

Side one and two as per original vinyl edition
The Raven: Treasures Captured

2018 CD reissue bonus tracks (Parlophone)

Personnel 

 The Stranglers

 Hugh Cornwell – guitar, vocals, second bass ("Dead Loss Angeles")
 Jean-Jacques Burnel – bass, vocals
 Dave Greenfield – keyboards, vocals
 Jet Black – drums

 Technical

 The Stranglers – production, cover concept
 Alan Winstanley – production, engineering, mixing
 Steve Churchyard – mixing
 George "Porky" Peckham – mastering
 Denis "BilBo" Blackham – mastering
 John Pasche – sleeve design coordination
 Shoot That Tiger! – inner sleeve design 
 Chris Ryan – sleeve photography (2D cover photo)         
 Toppan – sleeve photography (3D cover photo)
 Paul Cox – sleeve photography (back cover photo)
 Allan Ballard – sleeve photography (inner bag photo)

 Bonus tracks

 The Stranglers – production (all tracks, except "Nuclear Device"/"Genetix")
 Alan Winstanley – production, engineering (all tracks, except "G.m.b.H.", "Vietnamerica" and "Nuclear Device"/"Genetix")
 Steve Churchyard – production ("G.m.b.H."), engineering ("Bear Cage", "Vietnamerica", "G.m.b.H.")
 Dale Griffin – production ("Nuclear Device"/"Genetix")

References

External links 

 
 The Raven information, including original sleeve art

1979 albums
The Stranglers albums
Albums produced by Alan Winstanley
United Artists Records albums